Ali Nilforoshan (born 1 September 1975) is an Iranian equestrian jumper and trainer. He competed in the individual jumping event at the 2000 Summer Olympics.

References

1975 births
Living people
Iranian male equestrians
Olympic equestrians of Iran
Equestrians at the 2000 Summer Olympics
Place of birth missing (living people)
Equestrians at the 2002 Asian Games
Asian Games competitors for Iran
21st-century Iranian people